State Highway Spur 422 (Spur 422) is a state highway spur in San Antonio, Texas. It is known locally as the Poteet-Jourdanton Freeway.

Route description
Spur 422 begins at an intersection with Loop 410 and SH 16, near Palo Alto College. Northbound SH 16 follows westbound Loop 410, while northbound Spur 422 continues north along the Poteet-Jourdanton Freeway. The short route ends at an intersection with I-35.

History
Spur 422 is a former route of SH 16, and was designated (along with Spur 421) on November 16, 1965, after SH 16 was rerouted around the west side of San Antonio along the Loop 410 freeway.

Originally, the highway had a direct interchange with I-35 at its northern end. There are still many stubs, bridges, and grading for the ramps.

Major intersections

See also
List of highways in San Antonio, Texas
List of state highway spurs in Texas

References

422
Transportation in Bexar County, Texas